Dennis Miller Live was  a weekly talk show on HBO, hosted by comedian Dennis Miller. The show ran 215 episodes from 1994 to 2002, and received five Emmy awards and 11 Emmy nominations. It was also nominated six times for the Writers Guild of America Award for "Best Writing For A Comedy/Variety Series", and won three of those six times.

The show was idea of HBO executive producer Michael Fuchs, who told Miller he could use any forum he wanted as long as he brought in the numbers. It was directed by Debbie Palacio for most of its run, and head writers were first Jeff Cesario and then Eddie Feldmann. Other writers included José Arroyo, Rich Dahm, Ed Driscoll, David Feldman, Mike Gandolfi, Jim Hanna, Tom Hertz, Leah Krinsky, Rob Kutner, Rick Overton, Jacob Sager Weinstein, and David S. Weiss.

Format

The show was mainly characterized by its simplicity. The show had a small set, no house band, and limited lighting. It mainly consisted of Miller speaking to the largely unseen studio audience on a darkened stage.

The show's cold opening started with Miller doing a brief joke about a current event. The credit sequence showed Miller in a pool hall playing by himself set to "Everybody Wants to Rule the World" by Tears for Fears. In later seasons, the sequence was changed to show oversized toppling dominoes featuring images of political and social leaders. The final domino falls in front of Miller who walks away while an overhead shot shows the dominoes spelling out the word "LIVE". In the ninth and final season, the opening was very brief. It consisted only of a close-up of a monitor with the title of the show on it. A new original theme played as Miller immediately walked on stage to start the show.

Then Miller would perform a two-part monologue. The first part being the usual jokes about current events typical of late-night talk shows. This would then segue directly into a stream-of-consciousness diatribe that became Miller's trademark. This second part of monologue always began with the catchphrase "Now I don't want to get off on a rant here..." and ended with the phrase "Of course, that's just my opinion, I could be wrong." A series of books that compiled transcripts of these monologues were released during the run of the show, starting with 1996's The Rants to 2002's The Rant Zone.

Miller would discuss the topic of the day with one guest per show. During the first season, some guests were interviewed by satellite. During the guest segment, the show would also take phone calls. The call-in number was originally given as 1-800-LACTOSE. Reportedly, Miller chose the word "lactose" because it was the only word he could make with seven digits to make it a vanity number. But starting in the 1997 season, he stopped using the word and simply gave the corresponding numbers.

At the end of the interview, Miller would tell the guest "Stick around, I've gotta go do the news", at which time he would step next to a monitor named "The Big Screen". Black-and-white photographs from newspapers would be shown, and Miller would make humorous captions regarding them. At the finish of this segment, Miller would harken back to his SNL days by saying "That's the news, and I am outta here!"

References

External links
 

1990s American television talk shows
1994 American television series debuts
2000s American television talk shows
2002 American television series endings
HBO original programming
Primetime Emmy Award for Outstanding Variety Series winners
Primetime Emmy Award-winning television series
English-language television shows